Leopold Johannes Johanson (15 February 1888 Tartu – 5 December 1941 Sevurallag, Sverdlovsk Oblast, Russian SFSR) was an Estonian politician. He was a member of I Riigikogu and II Riigikogu.

1928–1929 he was Minister of Labour and Welfare and of Education. 1932–1933 he was Minister of Communications.

References

1888 births
1941 deaths
Politicians from Tartu
People from Kreis Dorpat
Estonian Social Democratic Workers' Party politicians
Estonian Socialist Workers' Party politicians
Government ministers of Estonia
Members of the Estonian Constituent Assembly
Members of the Riigikogu, 1920–1923
Members of the Riigikogu, 1923–1926
Members of the Riigikogu, 1926–1929
Members of the Riigikogu, 1929–1932
Members of the Riigikogu, 1932–1934
Members of the Riigivolikogu
Estonian people who died in Soviet detention
People who died in the Gulag